James T. Ronald (April 8, 1855 – December 27, 1950) was an American politician who served as the Mayor of Seattle from 1892 to 1894.

References

1855 births
1950 deaths
Mayors of Seattle
Washington (state) Democrats